The Enarmoniini are a tribe of tortrix moths.

Genera

References